Perkinsville is an unincorporated community in Madison County, Indiana, in the United States.

History
Perkinsville was laid out in 1837, and named for William Parkins (different spelling), an early settler. Perkinsville contained a post office from 1844 until 1912.

References

Unincorporated communities in Madison County, Indiana
Unincorporated communities in Indiana